The 1959 FDGB-Pokal was the eleventh edition of the FDGB-Pokal. The competition started with a qualifying round comprising the 30 finalists of the 15 regional district cups, 54 teams from the third tier II. DDR-Liga and 14 teams from the second tier DDR-Oberliga. The winners of the qualifying round then met the 14 teams from the first tier DDR-Oberliga in the First round.

Six teams from the DDR-Oberliga had already been eliminated by the Round of 16. This included the two finalists of the 1958 FDGB-Pokal SC Einheit Dresden and SC Lokomotive Leipzig. ASK Vorwärts Rostock and ASK Vorwärts Leipzig were the only remaining teams from the Bezirksligas in the Round of 16. The II. DDR-Liga was represented by four teams in the round. SC Chemie Halle and BSG Rotation Babelsberg were the only remaining teams from the DDR-Liga in the Round of 16.

SC Traktor Schwerin from the II. DDR-Liga was the only team from lower leagues that made it to the Quarter-finals. The team was then defeated 0–4 at home by SC Dynamo Berlin in the Quarter-finals. The new East German champion SC Wismut Karl-Marx-Stadt won a clear 3–0 victory against SC Turbine Erfurt in the Semi-finals. SC Dynamo Berlin, on the other hand, only managed to defeat BSG Motor Zwickau 2–1 in extra time.

SC Dynamo Berlin eventually won the final and captured its first cup title. However, the team was not allowed to participate in the 1960–61 European Cup Winners' Cup. The German Football Association of the GDR (DFV) instead found local rival and league runners-up ASK Vorwärts Berlin to be a more suitable representative of East Germany in the competition.

First round
The matches were played on 24 and 27 March 1959.

Replays

Second round
The matches were played on 4 and 10 June 1959.

Round of 16
The matches were played on 26 and 29 July 1959.

Quarter-finals
The matches were played on 19 and 26 August 1959.

Semi-finals
The two semi-finals were played on 14 and 21 October 1959.

Final

Statistics

First leg

Replay

Match summary 
No goal was scored after 120 minutes in the first final, due to effective defending from both teams and a lack of efficiency in the attack. Five goals were instead scored in regular time in the replay. The replay began with a furious start from SC Dynamo Berlin. The goal record showed that the new East German champion SC Wismut Karl-Marx-Stadt and third-placed SC Dynamo Berlin were two equal opponents. SC Wismut Karl-Marx-Stadt managed to equalize twice, before right-winger Christian Hofmann scored a winning goal for SC Dynamo Berlin from a sharp angle in the 67th minute. 

The replay was marked by constructive runs, which managed to put the attacking players in successful positions. In particular, the SC Dynamo Berlin strikers had learned from the first final and went straight in front of the goal of SC Wismut Karl-Marx-Stadt in the replay. The quick 1-0 goal after a successful combination from several SC Dynamo Berlin players, indicated that the East Berlin side would cope with the difficult snow-covered pitch better. However, SC Wismut-Karl-Marx-Stadt also showed stability after half an hour played, with an equalizer from Tröger, who had skillfully played off Heine. A high-class game now developed, where the players showed good technical qualities. 

The balanced game took a dramatic turn in the 55th minute. SC Dynamo Berlin was awarded a penalty kick, after a foul by Siegfried Wolf at Hermann Bley. The penalty kick was converted by Schröter. SC Wismut Karl-Marx-Staft player Bringfried Müller suddenly blew all fuses and attacked the referees with wild insults. Müller was consequently sent off. SC Wismut Karl-Marx-Stadt then continued the match with such severity that the match almost threatened to get out of hand. The match calmed down after an equalizer by Kaiser with a high cross that went directly into the goal of SC Synamo Berlin. However, SC Dynamo Berlin was able to take advantage of its numerical superiority. The team took the lead again two minutes later and was able to defend the lead until the final whistle.

Gallery

References

External links
 East German football in 1959 at rsssf.com

1959
East
Cup